Panah may refer to:

 Panah, Afghanistan
 Panah, Iran (disambiguation)
 Panah 1, PTV Play
 Panah 2, PTV Play

Panah, adalah kata yang belum lengkap.